Taianan Imbere Linhares Welker (born 13 March 1987), commonly known as Taianan or Tai, is a Brazilian football agent and former footballer who last played for Iraklis. Taianan played for several clubs in Brazil and Europe.

Career
Taianan started his professional career for FC Senec in 2006. He moved clubs almost annually playing for Maccabi Netanya, CSKA Sofia, Espanyol, CD Puertollano, Paraná Clube, Esporte Clube São José, Esporte Clube São José and SV Grödig. On 30 January 2013 Taianan signed for Greek Football League club Iraklis Thessaloniki. He made his debut for the club on 1 February 2013 in a match against Anagennisi Giannitsa. He scored his first goal for Iraklis a few weeks later, in an away win against Thrasyvoulos.  After playing one season in Greece as Iraklis´s nº10, he was brought by coach Siniša Gogić, who coached him at Iraklis, to Serbian side FK Napredak Kruševac. After problems with injuries, he left club and returned in Brazil. During the winter transfer window of 2015 he transferred to Bosnia and Herzegovina Premier League outfit Široki Brijeg. 

In summer 2016, after a short spell in Brazil with Sampaio Corrêa, he returned to Greece and joined Agrotikos Asteras playing in the 2016–17 Greek Football League.

After breaking with Iraklis in February 2019, he returned to the club in October 2019 to help the club, that just had been demoted to the Gamma Amateur Championship for the 2019-20 season.

National team
In 2006 Tai played with Brazil U-20.

Career statistics

Club

Honours
SV Grödig
 Austria First League: 2012–13
Iraklis
 Gamma Ethniki: 2017–18
 Macedonia FCA Fourth Division: 2019–20

References

External links
 
 
 

1987 births
Living people
People from Passo Fundo
Brazilian footballers
Association football midfielders
Brazilian expatriate footballers
Expatriate footballers in Slovakia
Expatriate footballers in Bulgaria
Expatriate footballers in Israel
Expatriate footballers in Spain
Expatriate footballers in Austria
Expatriate footballers in Greece
Expatriate footballers in Serbia
Expatriate footballers in Bosnia and Herzegovina
Expatriate footballers in Belarus
Serbian SuperLiga players
Grêmio Foot-Ball Porto Alegrense players
FC Senec players
PFC CSKA Sofia players
Maccabi Netanya F.C. players
RCD Espanyol B footballers
CD Puertollano footballers
Paraná Clube players
Esporte Clube São José players
SV Grödig players
Iraklis Thessaloniki F.C. players
FK Napredak Kruševac players
NK Široki Brijeg players
Sampaio Corrêa Futebol Clube players
Agrotikos Asteras F.C. players
FC Gorodeya players
Sportspeople from Rio Grande do Sul